The Galleria Sabauda is an art collection in the Italian city of Turin, which contains the royal art collections amassed by the House of Savoy over the centuries. It is located on Via XX Settembre, 86.

The museum, whose first directors were Roberto and Massimo d'Azeglio, unites the art collection of Eugene of Savoy, acquired after his death by his cousin, the king of Sardinia, with the works from the Royal Palace of Turin, the picture gallery of the Savoy-Carignano, and the artworks from the Palazzo Durazzo in Genoa, acquired in 1824.

On October 2, 1832 (his birthday), King Charles Albert of Savoy inaugurated the royal gallery at the Palazzo Madama, containing 365 paintings. In 1865, Massimo d'Azeglio had the collection transferred to Guarino Guarini's Palazzo dell'Accademia delle Scienze (1679) where it stood until 2012, before it was moved to the current location.

On December 4, 2014, in the presence of the Italian Minister of Culture, the "Manica Nuova" of Palazzo Reale (New Wing of the Royal Palace) was official opened. The collection has now found its final place to be exhibited. 
The gallery is based on a brand new museum project conceived and developed by the superintendent Edith Gabrielli (for the scientific part) together with Studio Albini Associati (staging). The lighting is by CastagnaRavelli Studio, based in Milan; graphics are by Noorda Design.

Collection
The collection includes works by Netherlandish artists such as  Gerrit Dou, Jan van Eyck, Rogier van der Weyden (side panels of the Annunciation Triptych), Jan van Huchtenburg, Hans Memling (Scenes from the Passion of Christ), Rembrandt, and Anthony van Dyck (Portrait of the Three Eldest Children of Charles I), as well as paintings by Italian artists such as Duccio di Buoninsegna (Gualino Madonna), Macrino d'Alba, Sandro Botticelli, Filippino Lippi (Three Angels and Young Tobias), Bernardo Daddi, Fra Angelico, Piero del Pollaiuolo, Agnolo Bronzino, Bernardo Bellotto, Giovanni Canavesio, Orazio Gentileschi (Annunciation), Andrea Mantegna, Girolamo Savoldo, Giovanni Battista Tiepolo, Gaudenzio and Defendente Ferrari, Giovanni Bellini, Guercino, Francesco Cairo, Sebastiano Ricci, Giovanni Martino Spanzotti, Titian, Paolo Veronese, and Tintoretto, and the Frenchman Pierre Subleyras.

Selected highlights

References

External links

Official website

   

National museums of Italy
Art museums and galleries in Piedmont
Museums in Turin
Art museums established in 1832
1832 establishments in Italy
Royal Palace of Turin